The current flag of Andalusia was adopted in 1918.  Blas Infante (1885–1936), the "Father of the Andalusian Fatherland", initiated an assembly at Ronda in 1918. This assembly adopted a charter based on the Antequera Constitution (a nationalist Andalusian charter that styled Andalusia as an autonomous republic inside a Spanish federal state; this constitution is known as Constitución Federal de Antequera) and also adopted the current flag of Andalusia and emblem as "national symbols". Its name used to be Arbonaida or also Arbondaira.

The colours of Andalusian flag, green and white, represent hope and peace, as the anthem says:

Variations

See also
Emblem of Andalusia

References

Flags of Spain
Andalusian culture
Flags introduced in 1918
1918 establishments in Spain
Andalusia